Phacelia floribunda is a species of phacelia known by the common names many-flowered phacelia, southern island phacelia and San Clemente Island phacelia. It is known only from San Clemente Island, one of the Channel Islands of California, and Guadalupe Island off the coast of Baja California. It grows in coastal sage scrub habitat in the canyons of these two islands.

Description
Phacelia floribunda is an annual herb with a branching erect stem reaching 60 centimeters in maximum height. It is glandular and hairy in texture. The leaves are up to 18 centimeters long and divided into several leaflets with lobed edges. The hairy inflorescence is a one-sided curving or coiling cyme of bell-shaped flowers. Each flower is under a centimeter long and purple or bluish in color.

References

External links
Jepson Manual Treatment - Phacelia floribunda
Phacelia floribunda - Photo gallery

floribunda
Flora of California
Flora of Baja California
Flora of Mexican Pacific Islands
Natural history of the California chaparral and woodlands
Natural history of the Channel Islands of California